Rand Merchant Investment Holdings, also referred to as RMI Holdings, is a listed financial services investment holding company that holds various insurance brands in South Africa, Australia, China, Mauritius, New Zealand, Republic of Ireland, Singapore, the United Kingdom and the United States of America.

Overview
RMI Holdings is listed on the JSE and insurance and investment products and services to retail, commercial, corporate and public sector customers. The group has its headquarters in Sandton, South Africa.

History
RMI Holdings was incorporated and registered in South Africa on 24 March 2010 as a wholly owned subsidiary of RMB Holdings. On 7 March 2011, RMB Holdings (RMBH), Remgro and FirstRand span off their insurance assets to RMI Holdings and separately listing it on the JSE.

RMB Holdings Restructure 
The RMB Holdings restructure was announced on 10 December 2010. Its aim was to create separate focused insurance and banking entities. Prior to the restructure RMB Holdings portfolio comprised
 FirstRand – 30% Shareholding.
 OUTsurance – 58.5% Shareholding – RMB Holdings held 45% of OUTsurance directly and an additional 45% through FirstRand bring the total control to 58.5%.
 Momentum Metropolitan Holdings – 18% Shareholding.
 Discovery – 25% Shareholding.
 RMB-Structured Insurance – 76% Shareholding.

The restructure was aimed at separating of RMBH's insurance and banking interests and was executed as follows:

 The transfer of the RMBH, Remgro and FirstRand's insurance interests to its newly incorporated wholly owned subsidiary, RMI Holdings. These insurance assets were transferred in exchange of additional shares in RMI Holdings.
 The unbundling of RMBH's shares in RMI Holdings to RMBH shareholders and the separate listing of RMI Holdings on the JSE by way of introduction. RMI Holdings would then become an insurance-focused investment entity.

Post Restructure 
The RMBH restructure was completed on 7 March 2011 and the shares of RMIH started trading at the JSE on the same day. This restructure was made possible due to the common shareholding in RMB Holding, Remgro and FirstRand. However, to date RMB Holdings and RMI Holdings share the same management team and resources under a management contract.

In January 2016, the firm changed its name to Rand Merchant Investment Holdings. This was in line with the firm's strategy to invest in the broader financial services sector and beyond the insurance industry. In the same year, RMI Holdings announced that it would be selling its entire shareholding in RMB-SI to Santam. 

In 2022, RMIH holding embarked on a restructure of its operations. This involved the unbundling its entire stake in Discovery Limited and Momentum Metropolitan Holdings Limited to its shareholders and the sale of its stake Hastings Group Holdings plc. The company also resolved to change its name to OUTsurance Group.

Member companies
The companies that compose RMI Holdings include:

Current investments 
 OUTsurance Holdings Limited – South Africa – 83.6% Shareholding – OUTsurance is a holding company with subsidiaries that conduct both short and long-term insurance activities. Its subsidiaries include:
 OUTsurance Life Insurance Company – South Africa – 100% Shareholding – Offering life insurance to the South African public.
 OUTsurance Insurance Company Limited – South Africa – 100% Shareholding – Offering general insurance.
 Youi (Proprietary) Limited – Australia – 93% Shareholding – Offering general insurance
 Youi New Zealand – New Zealand – 93% Shareholding – Offering general insurance – The Youi Insurance NZ portfolio was sold to Tower Insurance in December 2019.
 OUTsurance Namibia Insurance Company Limited – Namibia – 49% Shareholding – Offering general insurance. FNB Namibia owns 51% of the venture.
 RMI Investment Managers – South Africa – 100%Shareholding – The Investment advisory arm of the group.
 Entersekt  – South Africa – 25.1% Shareholding – An online banking security company.
 AlphaCode – South Africa – 100% Shareholding – A technology venture capital firm in South Africa.
 Merchant Capital – South Africa – 25.1% Shareholding – A provider of working capital finance to SMEs in South Africa. Held through AlphaCode.
 Prodigy Finance – UK – 3.5% Shareholding – an online platform that enables financing for international postgraduate students whilst delivering financial returns to investors.

Former investments 

 RMB-SI Investments Proprietary Limited – South Africa – RMB-SI trades in the short term and long term insurance sectors. RMIH sold its entire 76% Shareholding in RMB-SI to Santam in March 2017. RMB-SI included the following investments:
 RMB Structured Insurance Limited – South Africa – 100% Shareholding
 RMB Structured Life Limited – South Africa – 100% Shareholding
 RMB-SI Investments Mauritius Limited – Mauritius – 100% Shareholding
 RMB Financial Services Limited – Republic of Ireland – 100% Shareholding
 HCV Underwriting Managers Proprietary Limited – South Africa – 30% Shareholding
 Truffle Capital Proprietary Limited – South Africa – 23.4% Shareholding
 CIB Insurance Administrators Proprietary Limited – South Africa – 10.4% Shareholding
 Cyan Capital Proprietary Limited – South Africa – 10.44% Shareholding
 Discovery Limited – South Africa – 25.8% Shareholding – This is an integrated financial services organisation operating in the health insurance, life assurance, investment and health and wellness markets. Discovery operates in South Africa, the United Kingdom, China, Singapore and the United States through various brands. Discovery Limited's stock is listed on the JSE. 
 MMI Holdings Limited – South Africa – 25.2% Shareholding – MMI Holdings was formed through the merger of Momentum and Metropolitan. It is a leading financial services group conducting business in South Africa and elsewhere in Africa providing life insurance, short-term insurance, healthcare administration, asset management, investment and employee benefit programmes. Its stock is listed on the JSE.
 Hastings Group Holdings plc – UK – 29.9% Shareholding – A general insurance provider listed on the LSE.

Ownership
The shares of OUTsurance Group Limited (formerly RMI Holdings) are listed on the JSE.  the shareholding of OUTsurance Group Limited was as follows:

{| class="wikitable sortable" style="margin-left:auto;margin-right:auto"
|+ Rand Merchant Investment'Holdings|-
! style="width:2em;" |Rank !!Name of Owner!!Percentage Ownership
|-
|1|| Financial Securities Limited1 ||29.9
|-
|2|| Royal Bafokeng Holdings Proprietary Limited2  ||14.8
|-
|3||Allan Gray|| 8.0
|-
|4||Public Investment Corporation||7.0
|-
|5||Others Local and International Investors
|40.3
|-
| ||Total||100.00'|-
|}1→ Financial Securities Limited is a wholly owned subsidiary of Remgro.''

Governance
RMI Holdings is governed by a sixteen-person board of directors with Gerrit Thomas Ferreira as the chairman of the board and Dalu Ajene as the CEO. RMI Holdings shares a board with RMB Holdings.

See also

References

Financial services companies of South Africa
Insurance companies of South Africa
Companies based in Sandton
Conglomerate companies established in 2010
Financial services companies established in 2010
Holding companies established in 2010
Companies listed on the Johannesburg Stock Exchange
British companies established in 2010
Manufacturing companies established in 2010
Renewable resource companies established in 2010
South African companies established in 2010